The 5-demicube honeycomb (or demipenteractic honeycomb) is a uniform space-filling tessellation (or honeycomb) in Euclidean 5-space. It is constructed as an alternation of the regular 5-cube honeycomb.

It is the first tessellation in the demihypercube honeycomb family which, with all the next ones, is not regular, being composed of two different types of uniform facets. The 5-cubes become alternated into 5-demicubes h{4,3,3,3} and the alternated vertices create 5-orthoplex {3,3,3,4} facets.

D5 lattice 
The vertex arrangement of the 5-demicubic honeycomb is the D5 lattice which is the densest known sphere packing in 5 dimensions. The 40 vertices of the rectified 5-orthoplex vertex figure of the 5-demicubic honeycomb reflect the kissing number 40 of this lattice.

The D packing (also called D) can be constructed by the union of two D5 lattices. The analogous packings form lattices only in even dimensions. The kissing number is 24=16 (2n-1 for n<8, 240 for n=8, and 2n(n-1) for n>8).
 ∪ 

The D lattice (also called D and C) can be constructed by the union of all four 5-demicubic lattices: It is also the 5-dimensional body centered cubic, the union of two 5-cube honeycombs in dual positions.
 ∪  ∪  ∪  =  ∪ .

The kissing number of the D lattice is 10 (2n for n≥5) and its Voronoi tessellation is a tritruncated 5-cubic honeycomb, containing all bitruncated 5-orthoplex,  Voronoi cells.

Symmetry constructions 

There are three uniform construction symmetries of this tessellation. Each symmetry can be represented by arrangements of different colors on the 32 5-demicube facets around each vertex.

Related honeycombs

See also 
Uniform polytope
Regular and uniform honeycombs in 5-space:
5-cube honeycomb
5-demicube honeycomb
 5-simplex honeycomb
 Truncated 5-simplex honeycomb
 Omnitruncated 5-simplex honeycomb

References 

 Coxeter, H.S.M. Regular Polytopes, (3rd edition, 1973), Dover edition, 
 pp. 154–156: Partial truncation or alternation, represented by h prefix: h{4,4}={4,4}; h{4,3,4}={31,1,4}, h{4,3,3,4}={3,3,4,3}, ...
 Kaleidoscopes: Selected Writings of H. S. M. Coxeter, edited by F. Arthur Sherk, Peter McMullen, Anthony C. Thompson, Asia Ivic Weiss, Wiley-Interscience Publication, 1995,  
 (Paper 24) H.S.M. Coxeter, Regular and Semi-Regular Polytopes III, [Math. Zeit. 200 (1988) 3-45]

External links 

Honeycombs (geometry)
6-polytopes